This is a list of Chinese American associations. Some of these Chinese Associations may also exist outside the United States.

B
 Bing Kong Tong 秉公堂

C
 Camau Association of America (Thien Hau Temple) 美國金甌同鄉聯誼會 (天后宮) 
 Chinese American Citizens Alliance 同源會
 Chinese-American Museum of Chicago  (CAMOC) 芝加哥美洲华裔博物馆 - 李秉枢中心
 Chinese Consolidated Benevolent Association 中華會館 / 中華公所
 Chinese Freemasons (Chee Kong Tong) 洪門致公堂
 Chinese Historical Society of America 美國華人歷史學會
 Chinese Historical Society of Southern California 南加州華人歷史學會

E
 Eng Suey Sun Association 伍胥山公所

G
 Gin Family Association 甄舜河堂

H
 Hip Sing Association 協勝公會
 Hop Sing Tong 合勝堂

K
 Kong Chow Clan Association 岡州會館

L 
 Lin Sing Association 聯成公所 
 Lung Kong Tin Yee Association 龍岡親義公所

O
 On Leong Chinese Merchants Association 安良工商會
 Organization of Chinese Americans 美華協會

S
 Soo Yuen Benevolent Association 遡源堂 / 遡源公所
 Suey Sing Association 萃勝工商會

T

U
 United Chinese Society of Hawaii 檀香山中華總會館

Y
 Ying On Labor & Merchant Association 英端工商會

References

 http://ccbanyc.org/emember.html
 https://web.archive.org/web/20080924001410/http://www.chinatownla.com/businesses.php?c=3
 https://web.archive.org/web/20050307032405/http://stocktonchinese.org/links.htm
 https://web.archive.org/web/20091108102751/http://www.singtaoyp.com/listing.php?page=1&id=219&pid=10 (Traditional Chinese)
 http://www.lib.nus.edu.sg/chz/chineseoverseas/oc_associations.html
 http://www.ccba-ne.org/CCBA_By_laws_English_Final.pdf
 http://www.ccba-ne.org/CCBA_Bylaws_Chinese_Final.pdf (Traditional Chinese)

 
Chinese American